Jessi is the third studio album released by American country music artist Jessi Colter. It was her second release for Capitol Records and was produced by Ken Mansfield and husband, Waylon Jennings. It was recorded September–October 1975 at Woodland Sound Studios in Nashville and released in January 1976, becoming one of two albums issued by Colter in 1976.

Background
Jessi was released following the success of Colter's country pop crossover hit, "I'm Not Lisa" and all of the songs on the album were written entirely by Colter. The album spawned one major hit, "It's Morning (And I Still Love You)," which peaked at #11 on the Hot Country Songs chart in early 1976. Its second single, "Without You" did not make the Top 40. The album peaked at #4 on the Top Country Albums chart and #109 on the Billboard 200 albums chart.

Allmusic reviewed Jessi and gave it four and a half out of five stars. Reviewer, Jim Worbois stated he was surprised that, "this record wasn't more popular than it was. Many of these songs are better than her big hit."

Track listing
All songs composed by Jessi Colter.

"The Hand That Rocks the Cradle" – 3:08
"One Woman Man" – 4:23
"It's Morning (And I Still Love You)" – 2:20
"Rounder" – 3:47
"Here I Am" – 3:41
"Without You" – 3:56
"Darlin' It's Yours" – 3:06
"Would You Walk with Me (To the Lillies)" – 3:00
"All My Life, I've Been Your Lady" – 3:36
"I See Your Face (In the Morning's Window)" – 3:28

Personnel
Jessi Colter - lead vocals, keyboards
 Ritchie Albright – drums
 Duke Goff – bass
 Jim Gordon – horn
 Sherman Hayes – bass
 Dick Hyde – trombone
 Waylon Jennings – guitar, backing vocals
 Mackinley Johnson – trumpet
 Ken Mansfield – producer
 Ralph Mooney – pedal steel guitar
 Larry Muhoberac – piano
 Larry Murray – dulcimer
 Randy Scruggs – banjo, guitar
 Reggie Young – guitar

Charts 
Album – Billboard (North America), RPM (Canada)

Singles - Billboard (United States), RPM (Canada)

References

1976 albums
Jessi Colter albums
albums produced by Waylon Jennings
Capitol Records albums